Puerto San José is a town on Guatemala's Pacific Ocean coast,  in the department of Escuintla. It has a population of 23,887 (2018 census), making it the largest town along the Pacific coast of Guatemala. It was the Pacific port for Guatemala, but this was superseded in the 20th century by Puerto Quetzal, four kilometres to the east of the town. The Puerto Quetzal complex is the major employer in the town. The local tourist industry caters largely for weekenders from Guatemala City. San José Airport has been refurbished lately and is now the official alternate airport for Guatemala City.

References

External links

Populated places in the Escuintla Department
Ports and harbours of Guatemala
Port settlements in Central America